The Eastwood Park Bridge in Minot, North Dakota is a false arch structure that was built in 1927.  It was listed on the National Register of Historic Places in 1975.

It spans an oxbow of the Souris River.

See also 
Elliott Bridge: NRHP-listed Souris River crossing in McHenry County, North Dakota
Westgaard Bridge: NRHP listed Souris River crossing in McHenry County, North Dakota

References

Road bridges on the National Register of Historic Places in North Dakota
Bridges completed in 1927
Buildings and structures in Minot, North Dakota
Transportation in Ward County, North Dakota
National Register of Historic Places in Ward County, North Dakota
Concrete bridges in the United States
Cantilever bridges in the United States
Souris River
1927 establishments in North Dakota